Munnirpallam Sivasubramaniam Purnalingam Pillai (25 May 1866 – 6 June 1947) was a Tamil language-writer and Dravidologist.

Early life 
Purnalingam Pillai was born on 25 May 1866 to Sivasubramaniam Pillai at Munnirpallam in Tinnevely district. His parents belonged to a Saiva Vellalar family. After his initial education, Pillai joined as a lecturer of English at the Madras Christian College. During this period, Pillai got interested in studying Tamil history and civilization. He edited a Tamil journal called Gnanabodhini along with Parithimar Kalaignar.

Dravidology and political activism 
In 1904, Pillai published the first comprehensive study of Tamil literature as a historical narrative, titled A Primer of Tamil Literature. The narration was strongly imbibed with a Dravidian supremacist point of view. In the early 1920s, when excavations at Harappa and Mohenjodaro were in their nascent stages, Pillai, along with another Dravidologist, T. R. Sesha Iyengar, predicted that future discoveries would establish beyond doubt that the Indus Valley civilization was of Dravidian origin and also along with it the antiquity of Tamil civilization and language. He translated the entire Tirukkural into English in prose and published it in 1942.

Works

See also

 List of translators into English

References

Bibliography

Further reading
Purnalingam Pillai profile in Dina Mani

1866 births
1947 deaths
Tamil writers
Dravidologists
Tamil–English translators
Translators of the Tirukkural into English
Tirukkural translators